Sorovakatini Tuifagalele (born 15 June 1994) is a Fijian rugby union player, currently playing for the . His preferred position is lock.

Professional career
Tuifagalele was named in the Fijian Drua squad for the 2022 Super Rugby Pacific season.

References

External links
itsrugby.co.uk Profile

1994 births
Living people
Fijian rugby union players
Rugby union locks
Fijian Drua players